Amber Valley is a local government district and borough in the east of Derbyshire, England, taking its name from the River Amber. It covers a semi-rural zone with four main towns whose economy was based on coal mining and remains to some extent influenced by engineering, distribution and manufacturing, holding for instance the headquarters and production site of Thorntons confectionery. 

The seat in the House of Commons of Amber Valley is of smaller scope. The population at the 2011 Census was 122,309.

The village of Crich and other parts of the district were the setting for ITV drama series Peak Practice.

Towns of Amber Valley

Alfreton
Belper
Heanor
Ripley

Main villages of Amber Valley
Ambergate
Codnor
Crich
Denby
Duffield
Heage
Holbrook
Horsley
Horsley Woodhouse
Kedleston
Kilburn
Langley Mill
Lea & Holloway
Mackworth
Milford
Quarndon
Riddings
Smalley
Somercotes
Swanwick
Whatstandwell

The district was formed on 1 April 1974 by the merger of the urban districts of Alfreton, Belper, Heanor and rural districts of Ripley and Belper. The Amber Valley district was granted borough status in 1988.

Parishes
Aldercar and Langley Mill, Alderwasley, Alfreton, Ashleyhay
Belper
Codnor, Crich
Denby, Dethick, Lea and Holloway, Duffield
Hazelwood, Heanor and Loscoe, Holbrook, Horsley, Horsley Woodhouse
Idridgehay and Alton, Ironville
Kedleston, Kilburn, Kirk Langley
Mackworth, Mapperley
Pentrich
Quarndon
Ravensdale Park, Ripley
Shipley, Shottle and Postern, Smalley, Somercotes, South Wingfield, Swanwick
Turnditch
Weston Underwood, Windley

Council

Elections to the borough council are held in three out of every four years, with one third of the 45 seats on the council being elected at each election. The council has been run by the Conservative Party since they gained control from the Labour Party at the 2000 election except for a single year after the 2014 election and for two years after the 2019 election. Following the 2022 election the council is  composed of the following numbers of councillors:

Arms

See also
List of places in Derbyshire

References

External links 
 Amber Valley Borough Council website
 Amber Valley Centre for Voluntary Services
 Amber Valley Info Web Site

 
Non-metropolitan districts of Derbyshire
Boroughs in England